Playlist: The Very Best of R. Kelly is a compilation album by American R&B singer R. Kelly. The album features some of Kelly's released and unreleased songs (as singles) over the course of his career. It peaked at #60 on the Billboard's R&B/Hip Hop Album chart.

Track list 
 "I Believe"
 "Step in the Name of Love (Remix)"
 "I Wish (To The Homies That We Lost Remix)"
 "Your Body's Callin'"
 "Same Girl" (with Usher)
 "I Believe I Can Fly"
 "Hair Braider"
 "Bump n' Grind"
 "Happy People"
 "Ignition (Remix)"
 "Supaman High" (featuring OJ da Juiceman)
 "When A Woman's Fed Up"
 "The World's Greatest"
 "Religious"

References 

2010 compilation albums
R. Kelly albums
Kelly, R.